Highways Department is a department of the Hong Kong Government responsible for developing Hong Kong's road and railway network as well as road maintenance.

History
The department was previously an office within the former Civil Engineering Department and became an independent department on 1June 1986 due to the increasingly complex road network in Hong Kong.

Directors
 Harold Campbell Beaton (1986–1989)
 Kwei See Kan (1989–1993)
 Kwong Hon Sang (1993–1996)
 Leung Kwok Sun (1996–2000)
 Lo Yiu Ching (2000–2002)
 Mak Chai Kwong (2002–2006)
 Wai Chi Sing (2006–2010)
 Peter Lau Ka Keung (2010–2016)
 Daniel Chung Kum-wah (2016–2018)
 Jimmy Chan Pai Ming (2018–present)

See also
Civil Engineering and Development Department
Transport Department
Hong Kong Strategic Route and Exit Number System

References

Bibliography

External links

Hong Kong government departments and agencies